James Hightower could refer to: 

James Robert Hightower (1915–2006), American sinologist
Jim Hightower (born 1943), American columnist and political activist